The Fellowship of Christian Assemblies (FCA) is a Pentecostal Christian association with roots in a revival during the 1890s among the Scandinavian Baptist and Pietist communities in the United States.

In 1907 most of those congregations that experienced revival (many named , 'Assembly of God' in Norwegian) learned about the Pentecostal movement through William Howard Durham Mission in Chicago.  One of his assistant elders, F. A. Sandgren, published , a periodical for Scandinavians, and consequently many Midwest churches joined the Pentecostal movement.

Scandinavian Pentecostalism was marked by a congregationalist church government, which led to isolation from the other Pentecostal groups in North America and the formation of loose networks, such the Fellowship of Christian Assemblies and the Independent Assemblies of God, International.

Though sharing some common background in the Pentecostal movement, the Fellowship of Christian Assemblies should be distinguished as a separate body from the Assemblies of God.

See also
International Fellowship of Christian Assemblies

References
Handbook of Denominations in the United States, by Frank S. Mead, Samuel S. Hill, and Craig D. Atwood

External links
 Fellowship of Christian Assemblies (Official Ministers' Website)

Pentecostalism in the United States
Pentecostal denominations
Finished Work Pentecostals